Fan Mei-sheng (born 13 September 1942) also known as Fan Mui-sang, is a prolific Hong Kong Cantonese actor.

Fan Mei-sheng started acting in movies from 1964; his first movie was The Story of Sue San. He made his name in Shaw Brothers Studio productions, including the role of 'Black Whirlwind' in All Men Are Brothers. Through the 1970s and 1980s, he was often cast as the villain in many Hong Kong martial arts films and thrillers. In 1979, Fan replaced Simon Yuen (who died during filming) in The Magnificent Butcher. That, as well as his role as an explosives man in The Postman Fights Back, became one of his best known performances. He also acted in the Michael Cimino film, Year of the Dragon; and in total has acted in one hundred films. In addition, he has directed one film, Amsterdam Connection in 1978, and produced another, Dark Side of Chinatown in 1989.

Mei-sheng is the father of actor Louis Fan Siu-wong, with whom he appeared in the 1992 film Riki-Oh: The Story of Ricky. He retired from acting in 1994, and has since been his son's manager, as well as a professor at the Shanghai School of Performing Arts. He had a minor role, again alongside his son, in the 2018 film Attrition.

References

1942 births
Living people
Hong Kong directors
Hong Kong male actors
Hong Kong producers